Surfside Girls is an American children's adventure mystery streaming series based on IDW Publishing's graphic novels of the same name by Kim Dwinell. The series follows best friends Jade (Miya Cech) and Sam (YaYa Gosselin), who seek to solve a ghost mystery. It premiered August 19, 2022 on Apple TV+.

Synopsis
Jade and Sam, best friends, are ready to enjoy their summer surfing in the sun. When they are confronted by a ghost, the two learn of a mystery involving a pirate ship and a cursed treasure rumored to be hidden beneath Surfside's famed Danger Point bluff. Sam seeks to assist a pirate spirit named Remi remove the curse after meeting him, while Jade is keen to establish a scientific explanation for ghosts. Sam and Jade have to mix their diverse perspectives in reasoning and creativity to uncover the truth. They are determined to piece together the evidence, discover the truth, and protect Surfside as a whole.

Cast

Main
Miya Cech as Jade
YaYa Gosselin as Sam
Spencer Hermes-Rebello as Remi

Recurring
Adan Maverick Carcano as Petey
Christine Lin as Mei-Lin
Michelle Mao as Amy
Joseph Mesiano as Captain Devar
Catia Ojeda as Monica
Jacob Vargas as Bob
Steven Chan as Fong
Sonita Henry as Dr. Olympia Pfeiffer
Victoria Blade as Kimber

Episodes

Background
In December 2021, Apple TV+ ordered 10 episodes of Surfside Girls, based on IDW Publishing's graphic novels of the same name by Kim Dwinell. Miya Cech and YaYa Gosselin were cast in the lead roles. Other crew members included writer, executive producer and showrunner May Chan; executive producers Paul Stupin, Lydia Antonini, Paul Davidson, and Jeff Brustrom; writers and executive producers Alex Diaz and Julie Sagalowsky Diaz; and the first two episode's director and writer America Young. In May 2022, Christine Lin and Catia Ojeda was reportedly cast in a recurring role.

Release
Surfside Girls premiered on August 19, 2022, on Apple TV+.

References

External links

2020s American children's television series
2020s American mystery television series
2022 American television series debuts
American children's adventure television series
American children's mystery television series
Apple TV+ original programming
Television series about children
Television series about ghosts
Television series about pirates
Television series about teenagers
Television series based on books
Apple TV+ children's programming
IDW Publishing adaptations